Ruth Esperanza Tapia Roa is a Nicaragua diplomat who served as the Nicaraguan Permanent Representative to United Nations Education, Scientific and Cultural Organisation (UNESCO) Extraordinary and Plenipotentiary Ambassador to the Organization of American States (OAS). She was removed in September 2019 by a presidential decree issued by President Paul Oquist Kelley just three months as ambassador to Organization of American States ending her diplomatic career.

References 

Nicaraguan diplomats
Permanent Representatives to the United Nations in Geneva
Organization of American States people
Nicaraguan women diplomats
Date of birth missing (living people)
Place of birth missing (living people)
Year of birth missing (living people)
Living people